The Joshua Davis House at 1888 S. Main St. in Orem, Utah, United States, was built in 1892.  It was listed on the National Register of Historic Places (NRHP) in 1998.

J. Cory Jensen, in its NRHP nomination, wrote:The Davis house is a good example of the transitional character of the architecture on the Provo Bench
at the latter-part of the 19th century. The salmon-colored, soft-fired brick, found on many of the homes
in the region, became available on the Provo Bench in the early 1880s which allowed for greater
variation in used in Victorian-style architecture. Although Classical in form, the Victorian influence in
the architectural details is readily apparent. Because many of the farmers on the bench struggled to
make an income for many years, the architecture of their homes remained in the simple,
unembellished Classical-style architecture of their predecessors. Those who saw success in their
farms began to build or alter their present homes in the Victorian styles, mainly the Victorian Eclectic
which enlisted such details as asymmetrical facades, bay windows, arched window and door openings,
wooden shingles on the vertical surfaces, decorative brickwork, and leaded-glass windows. The Davis
house combines a Classical house type with many of the Victorian Eclectic features common from 1885-1910.

References

Houses completed in 1892
Houses in Orem, Utah
Houses on the National Register of Historic Places in Utah
Victorian architecture in Utah
National Register of Historic Places in Orem, Utah